Arrate Orueta (born 8 August 1984) is a Spanish retired footballer who played as a midfielder for Athletic Bilbao. Since retiring, she works as a doctor in Barakaldo.

Titles
 Primera División (women): 2003, 2004, 2005, 2007

References

1984 births
Living people
Spanish women's footballers
Footballers from Bilbao
Athletic Club Femenino players
Primera División (women) players
Women's association football midfielders
Athletic Club Femenino B players